Now and Later is an American brand of fruit-flavored taffy-like candy manufactured by Ferrara Candy Company.  The candy is formed into squares packaged in colorful paper. Twelve flavors are currently available in both Traditional and Chewy varieties.

History
Now and Later was created in Brooklyn, New York in 1962 by The Phoenix Candy Company.

The name Now and Later was meant to suggest to customers that they are going to like them now and then want some more later. Alluding to the candy's signature chewy texture, the name also suggests that if one puts a piece in one's mouth now, one will still be chewing it later. The Phoenix Candy Company also sold several candy-and-a-toy products. 
In 1978, Phoenix was sold to Beatrice Foods.
 
The company merged with Leaf in 1983, and sold it to Nabisco in 1992. Farley's & Sathers Candy Company bought it in 2002 after Kraft/Philip Morris' acquisition of Nabisco. In 2012, Farley's & Sathers Candy Company merged with Ferrara Pan Candy Company and the name of the company was changed to Ferrara Candy Company.

Flavors
The twelve flavors of Now and Later available are apple, banana, blue raspberry, cherry/apple splits, cherry, grape, strawberry, tropical lemonade, tropical punch, watermelon, wild fruits, and "original".

See also 
 Starburst 
 List of confectionery brands

References

External links

Ferrara Candy Company

Brand name confectionery
Ferrara Candy Company brands
Products introduced in 1962
Food and drink introduced in 1962
American brands